Water polo, for the 2013 Bolivarian Games, took place from 25 November to 30 November 2013. However, only the men's teams competed at these Games.

Medalists
Athletes' Names List that won Medals in Water Polo
Summary Results for Water Polo at 2013 BG

References

Events at the 2013 Bolivarian Games
2013 in water polo
2013